Taktsé (also written Tagtse, Dagzê, or Stag-rtse) can refer to:

Taktsé Castle in central Tibet.
Dagzê District in the Tibet Autonomous Region of China.
Taktse International School in Sikkim, India.

See also
Tangtse village in Ladakh, India